Florence Masebe is a South African actress, known locally for her role in the series Muvhango.
She won Africa Movie Academy Award for Best Actress in a Leading Role at the 9th Africa Movie Academy Awards.

Filmography
 Morwalela
 7 de Laan Afrikaans
 Scandal
 Task Force
 Soul City
 Elelwani
 Ring Of Lies

References

External links
 

South African television actresses
Living people
Best Actress Africa Movie Academy Award winners
1972 births